Michael Strickland is the name of:

Michael Strickland (British Army officer) (1913–1982), British military adviser to the King of Jordan
Mike Strickland (born 1951), Canadian football player
Michael Strickland (physicist) (born 1969), American theoretical physicist
Michael Strickland (actor) (born 1971), American actor
Michael Strickland (blogger) (born 1980), American conservative blogger